The Tolman surface brightness test is one out of six cosmological tests that were conceived in the 1930s to check the viability of and compare new cosmological models. Tolman's test compares the surface brightness of galaxies as a function of their redshift (measured as z). Such a comparison was first proposed in 1930 by Richard C. Tolman as a test of whether the universe is expanding or static. It is a unique test of cosmology, as it is independent of dark energy, dark matter and Hubble constant parameters, testing purely for whether Cosmological Redshift is caused by an expanding universe or not. For such a fundamental test of cosmology, it has seen very little attention (this page is a comprehensive summary of all work done). 
 
In a simple (static and flat) universe, the light received from an object drops proportional to the square of its distance and the apparent area of the object also drops proportional to the square of the distance, so the surface brightness (light received per surface area) would be constant, independent of the distance. In an expanding universe, however, there are two effects that change this relation. First, the rate at which photons are received is reduced because each photon has to travel a little farther than the one before. Second, the energy of each photon observed is reduced by the redshift. At the same time, distant objects appear larger than they really are because the photons observed were emitted at a time when the object was closer.

One of the earliest and most comprehensive studies was published in 1996, as observational requirements limited the practicality of the test till then. This test found consistency with an expanding universe. However, therein, the authors note that: 

A later paper that reviewed this one removed their assumed expansion cosmology for calculating SB, to make for a fair test, and found that the 1996 results, once the correction was made, did not rule out a static universe.

To date, the most complex investigation of the relationship between surface brightness and redshift was carried out using the 10 m Keck telescope to measure nearly a thousand galaxies' redshifts and the 2.4 m Hubble Space Telescope to measure those galaxies' surface brightness. The exponent found is not 4 as expected in the simplest expanding model, but 2.6 or 3.4, depending on the frequency band. The authors summarize:

However, the authors tested a specific Einstein Desitter static universe model where one of the effects of expansion that contributes a (1+z) term, namely time dilation, was left in. In order to test a truly static universe with no time dilation effects from expansion, this term was removed and corrected for, and it was Found that these previous results did not rule out a static universe.

As the predicted effects between static and expansion diverge dramatically towards higher redshifts, the most comprehensive test done to date was out to z=5, much larger than the previous largest which only went to z=0.9: this test found their results to be consistent with a static universe, but unable to rule out expansion if significant galaxy evolution was expected.

See also 
 Source counts
 Tired light
 Time dilation

Footnotes 

Physical cosmology